King Kaolie of Chu (died 238 BC) was the king of the state of Chu from 262 BC to 238 BC during the late Warring States period of ancient China.  He was born Xiong Yuan or Xiong Wan, and King Kaolie was his posthumous title.

King Kaolie succeeded his father King Qingxiang of Chu, who died in 263 BC.  In 249 BC King Kaolie invaded and annexed the State of Lu. 

King Kaolie died in 238 BC after 25 years of reign, and was succeeded by his son King You of Chu.

References

Monarchs of Chu (state)
Chinese kings
3rd-century BC Chinese monarchs
238 BC deaths
Year of birth unknown